The Himachal Pradesh High Court is the High Court of the state of Himachal Pradesh.

The Chief Justice

On 14 October 2021, Justice Mohammad Rafiq took oath as the Chief Justice of Himachal Pradesh High Court.

List of Chief Justices

References

Himachal Pradesh High Court
Chief Justices